Broom's Barn Experimental Station is a research institute in Suffolk, United Kingdom. The current farm manager is Mark Gardner

History
It merged in 1987 to become part of the Institute of Arable Crops Research. The funding for the site came from the Sugar Beet Research and Education Committee, which became the British Beet Research Organisation (BBRO). The research which was being carried out was shut down for unknown reasons by the director of the farm, and samples of the seed were left there, as well as all of the lab equipment after scientists had to leave.

Structure
It is situated just south of the A14. In the early 2000s, the site employed around 70 people. It researched sugar beet. Until 1967, the Higham railway station served the site.

References

External links
 British Beet Research Organisation

1962 establishments in England
Agricultural research institutes in the United Kingdom
Research institutes established in 1962
Research institutes in Suffolk
Rothamsted Experimental Station
Sugar organizations